Sangachal may refer to:

Sanqaçal, settlement and municipality in Baku
Sangachal Terminal, industrial complex in Baku